Aimé Leon Dore (pronounced 'eh-meh lee-on door') is a fashion and lifestyle brand based in Queens, New York, founded in March 2014. Led by founder Teddy Santis, Aimé Leon Dore has their flagship store located on Mulberry Street in Manhattan's Nolita neighborhood.

History 
In 2015, the brand collaborated with Puma on an update of Puma's classic State sneaker. In 2016, ALD opened its first physical retail location on Mott St. in New York's Nolita neighborhood. The shop quickly developed a reputation for its strong community, evolving interior (which changed with each seasonal collection), and its mysterious exterior (with curtains hung over the door and street-facing windows). In 2017, Aimé Leon Dore collaborated with KITH on hoodies, t-shirts, pullover sailing jackets, pants, and caps with a nautical theme and anchors, boat paddles, and evil eye iconography inspired by Mykonos.

In 2019, ALD moved to a larger storefront on nearby Mulberry St, That also has an attached nostalgic coffee shop. The new store gave greater expression to the brand's creative vision and included a living-room style interior evoking classic Parisian homes, an installation from New York artist Tyrrell Winston, as a well as Café Leon Dore, a Mediterranean coffee shop inspired by Santis' Greek roots with outdoor seating. Jon Caramanica of The New York Times  reviewed ALD's Mulberry flagship in his column "Critical Shopper." The piece described ALD as a post-streetwear heritage brand.

To date, ALD has collaborated with New Balance on three major projects spanning three seasons (Spring/Summer 2019, Fall/Winter 2020, and Spring/Summer 2020). Each project has seen ALD deliver its unique take on New Balance's heritage and design in ways which pay homage to life in New York. The inaugural project in April 2019 focused on NB's iconic 997 silhouette; a collection featuring the 990v2 and 990v5 followed in November 2019; and the brand delivered a project featuring the 827 (the first time the shoe had been revived following its launch over 20 years ago) in March 2020.

In February 2020, ALD released the first-of-its-kind ALD 964, a one-of-one custom 1990 Porsche 964 911 Carrera 4 restored with Porsche's blessing and support, the first time they had lent their official backing to a vintage 911 restoration. The project included a video campaign, limited-edition capsule collection, and physical activation at the Deitch gallery on Wooster St. in New York's SoHo district.

Description
The brand's  design is influenced by classic hip hop and basketball, and  Teddy Santis's experiences growing up between Queens and Greece in the 1990s.

The brand has also collaborated with  Woolrich, Suicoke, Timberland, New Balance, New Era, Paraboot, Drake's, and Porsche.

See also
A Bathing Ape
Billionaire Boys Club
Virgil Abloh
OVO
Chrome Hearts
Dover Street Market
KITH

References

External links
			
These Aimé Leon Dore Kicks Will Make Sneakerheads Jealous Jake Woolf, GQ magazine, March 16, 2017
Aimé Leon Dore's New Collection is the Spring Style Upgrade You've Been Looking For Esquire magazine March 10, 2017

Clothing companies of the United States
Clothing brands
High fashion brands
Chinatown, Manhattan
Clothing companies based in New York City